Delirium is the fourth studio album by folk rock band Capercaillie released in 1991 by Survival Records.  It was issued in North America by Valley Entertainment in 2002.

Track listing
 "Rann Na Móna" (Manus Lunny) – 3:50
 "Waiting For The Wheel To Turn" (Donald Shaw) – 4:36
 "Aodann Srath Bhàin (The Slopes of Strath Ban)" (Trad. Arr. Capercaillie) – 4:05
 "Cape Breton Song" (Trad. Arr. Capercaillie) – 3:02
 "You Will Rise Again" (John Saich) – 3:31
 "Kenny MacDonald's Jigs" (N. MacDonald) – 3:58
 "Dean Sàor An Spiórad" (Shaw) – 4:24
 "Coisich A Rùin (Come On My Love)" (Trad. Arr. Capercaillie) – 3:13
 "Dr. MacPhail's Reel" (Trad. Arr. Capercaillie) – 2:50
 "Heart Of The Highland" (Saich) – 3:48
 "Breisleach (Delirium)" (Aonghas MacNeacall/Shaw) – 2:41
 "Islay Ranter's Reels" (Trad. Arr. Capercaillie) – 3:03
 "Servant To The Slave" (M. Lunny) – 5:44

Credits

Capercaillie
 Karen Matheson - vocals
 Marc Duff - Whistles, Bodhran, Wind Synthesiser
 Manus Lunny - Bouzouki, Guitar, Vocals on tracks 1 and 13
 Charlie McKerron - Fiddle
 John Saich - Bass, Guitar on track 10, Vocals on tracks 5 and 10
 Donald Shaw - Accordion, Keyboards

Guest musicians
 Ronnie Goodman - Percussion and drums
 Noel Bridgeman - Drums on track 3
 Graham Dickson - Drum programming
 Jon Turner - Drum programming

External links
 Song lyrics on Capercaillie's official website

References 

Capercaillie (band) albums
1991 albums
Scottish Gaelic music